Prendergast is a British and Irish surname.

Etymology

This toponymic surname may derive from prender from a Germanic word for fire or conflagration (cf. brand) where the b became p due to fortition and gast (cf. geest) from a germanic word for wasteland or dry and infertile land meaning the location could have been a burn-beat area. Others think the name is a Saxonized form of Bryn y Gest from the Welsh bryn meaning hill and gest a lenition of cest which means belly or swelling or a deep glen between two mountains having but one opening. It could also lessly come from Pren-dwr-gwest, the inn by the tree near the water. The right etymology is probably Pen-dre-gast. The suffix ast (cf. gast) is of Welsh origin like the names of  the cromlech chamber tomb of Penllech yr Ast (the chief slab of the bitch) or Llech-yr-ast (Bitch's stone), in Llangoedmor, Cardiganshire or Gwâl y Filiast (Lair of the Greyhound Bitch) or Carn Nant-yr-ast or Llety'r Filiast or Twlc y Filiast.  Alternatively, the name may come from a lost Flemish settlement near Ghent, known as Brontegeest.  Pembrokeshire had a significant Flemish population by the twelfth century.

People with the name
 Catherine Prendergast, American scholar and intellectual historian
 Charles Prendergast (1863–1948), Canadian-American artist
 Declan Prendergast (born 1981) Irish hurler
 Edmond Francis Prendergast (1843–1918), Irish-born Roman Catholic prelate and Archbishop of Philadelphia, who gave misname to Archbishop Prendergast High School in Philadelphia, U.S
 Frank Prendergast (1933–2015), Irish politician
 George Prendergast (1854–1937), Australian politician, 28th Premier of Victoria
 George C. Prendergast (born 1961), American oncologist and biomedical scientist
 Guy Prendergast (British Army officer) (1905–1986), British Army brigadier and Saharan explorer
 Harry Prendergast (1834–1913), British Army general, recipient of the Victoria Cross
 Ian Prendergast (born 1980), Australian rules footballer
 James Prendergast (disambiguation)
 John Prendergast (disambiguation)
 Kathleen Prendergast (1910–1954), Australian paleontologist and physician
 Kerry Prendergast (born 1953), New Zealand politician
 Kieran Prendergast (born 1942), British diplomat and former Under-Secretary-General for Political Affairs at the United Nations
 Mark Prendergast, Scottish 21st century actor
 Mark Prendergast (hurler) (born 1978), Irish hurler
 Mark Prendergast, guitarist for the Irish band Kodaline
 Maurice Prendergast (1858–1924), American painter
 Maurice de Prendergast, Norman knight
 Mick Prendergast (1950–2010), English footballer
 Mike Prendergast (born 1977), Irish rugby union footballer
 Mike Prendergast (baseball) (1888–1967), American Major League Baseball pitcher
 Orla Prendergast (born 2002), Irish woman cricketer
 Paddy Prendergast (racehorse trainer) (1910–1980), Irish trainer
 Paddy Prendergast (hurler) (born 1958), Irish hurler
 Patrick Prendergast (academic), Provost of Trinity College, Dublin
 Patrick Prendergast (abbot)  (c. 1741–1829), last Abbot of Cong and guardian of the Cross of Cong
 Patrick Eugene Prendergast (1868–1894), American assassin of Chicago Mayor Carter Harrison Sr.
 Paudie Prendergast (born 1960), Irish hurler
 Peter Prendergast (artist) (1946–2007), Welsh artist
 Peter Prendergast (hurler), Irish hurler
 Peter Prendergast (referee) (born 1963), Jamaican football referee
 Robert Prendergast (1864–1946), British admiral
 Séamus Prendergast (born 1980), Irish hurler
 Sharon Marley Prendergast (born 1964),  Jamaican singer, dancer and curator, adopted daughter of Bob Marley
 Shaun Prendergast ( Born 1958) British actor, playwright, screenwriter and novelist
 Segismundo Moret y Prendergast (1833–1913), Spanish politician, President of the Council of Ministers
 Terrence Prendergast (born 1944), Archbishop of Ottawa
 Tessa Prendergast (1928–2001), Jamaican actress, fashion designer, businesswoman and socialite
 Thomas Prendergast (disambiguation)
 Tom Prendergast (Laois footballer), Irish Gaelic football player
 William A. Prendergast (1867–1954), American businessman and politician

Variants
Variants of Prendergast include: Pender, Pendergast, Prandergast, Brandergast, Pendergrass, Penders, Pendy, Pinder, Pinders, Pindy, Prender, Prendergrast, Prendergest, Prindergast, Pendergist and the (Gaelicised) de Priondargás.

In Britain
The surname may be connected to one or more of three places in Britain: Prendergast, now a suburb of Haverfordwest, Pembrokeshire, Wales;  Prendergast, near Solva, also in Pembrokeshire, and; Prenderguest, near Ayton, Berwickshire, Scotland.

In Ireland
In Ireland, Prendergast is regarded as a Hiberno-Norman name and is usually derived from a 12th-century Cambro-Norman knight, Maurice de Prendergast, who was born in Pembrokeshire and came to Ireland with the Earl of Pembroke, Richard "Strongbow" de Clare. Many of Maurice de Prendergast's immediate descendants lived in County Tipperary and southern Mayo. Some assumed the name Fitzmaurice at an early date and some of the Fitzmaurices were later known as MacMorris.

See also
Prendergast baronets

References 

Surnames of Norman origin
Celtic-language surnames